Wildorado Independent School District is a public school district based in the community of Wildorado, Texas (USA).

Located in Oldham County, the district extends into portions of Deaf Smith and Randall counties.

The district operates one school serving grades Pre-K–6, and accepts transfer students from other districts (going so far as to operate bus service to the Home Depot in Amarillo to pick up students). Students in grades 7–12 attend the neighboring Vega Independent School District unless parents choose another neighboring district.

In 2009, the school district was rated "exemplary" by the Texas Education Agency.

References

External links
 Wildorado ISD

School districts in Oldham County, Texas
School districts in Deaf Smith County, Texas
School districts in Randall County, Texas